Pan Yueming (born 9 May 1974) is a Chinese actor. Pan is noted for his roles as Tai Lin in the film A Love of Blueness, and as twin brothers Guan Hongfeng and Guan Hongyu on the Chinese web series Day and Night.

Pan ranked 97th on Forbes China Celebrity 100 list in 2019, and 64th in 2020.

Early life 
Pan was born and raised in Xuanwu District, Beijing. Pan's ancestral home in Xinfeng County, Shaoguan, Guangdong.

Education 
Pan graduated with a degree in Arts from Beijing Normal University.

Career 
Pan made his acting debut in Romance of the Three Kingdoms, playing Sun Xiu, son of Sun Quan and the third Emperor of Eastern Wu. Pan's first film role was uncredited appearance in the film The Story of Yi Bo (1994).

In 2000, Pan played the lead role in Lu Xuechang's A Lingering Face,  which earned him a Best New Performer Award at the Beijing College Student Film Festival.

In 2001, Pan co-starred with Yuan Quan in Huo Jianqi's A Love of Blueness, based on the novel Performance Art by Fang Fang, for which he received the Best Actor Award nominations at the Golden Rooster Award and Hundred Flowers Awards. At the same year, he won the Golden Phoenix Award for Male Actor. Pan portrayed Fang Yi'an, the son of prime minister Fang Xuanling, in the historical television series Love Legend of the Tang Dynasty.

Pan won the TV Film Best Actor Award at the Beijing College Student Film Festival for his performance in Desire For Fired, and was nominated for Best Supporting Actor Award at the Hundred Flowers Awards for his performance in Life Show.

Pan earned his second Hundred Flowers Award for Best Actor nomination for his performance as Lin Wei in Extreme Danger (2002).  That same year, he starred in Stormy Sea, and won the Outstanding New Actor Award at the Huabiao Awards.

In 2004, Pan was cast in the historical television series The Legendary Emperor Zhu Yuanzhang, playing the son of Chen Baoguo's and Xu Fan's characters.

In 2007, Pan appeared as Zhu Huifang, a Beijing Opera actor who is Mei Lanfang's cousin, in Chen Kaige's film Forever Enthralled.

Pan had a cameo appearance in Looking for Jackie, a 2009 film starring Zhang Yishan and Jackie Chan.  He was cast in the comedy film All's Well, Ends Well 2010, in which he played a couple with Xiong Dailin.

In 2010, Pan portrayed Cai Hesen, who was an early leader of the Chinese Communist Party (CCP) and a friend and comrade of Mao Zedong, in the film The Founding of a Party.

In 2013, Pan reunited with co-star Zhang Jingchu  in the romantic comedy film The Old Cinderella.

In 2015, Pan was cast in the film Blind Spot, playing Chen Wen, a psychopathic teacher.

In 2016, Pan was cast in the television series How Much Love Can Be Repeated.

On August 30, 2017, the web series Day and Night was released on Youku, in which Pan played the lead roles Guan Hongfeng and Guan Hongyu.

Personal life
Pan began dating Dong Jie in August 2005, when they filmed in Hongyifan. Dong Jie was engaged to Pan Yueming in the early 2008. On September 26, 2008, Pan married Dong and they have a son Dingding (February 5, 2009).

On October 20, 2012, they were divorced. The agent of Dong Jie stated that Pan Yueming is a gambler, Pan Yueming has hit back at Dong's team, accusing them of their defamation. In May 2014, Pan finally won the lawsuit. The team of Dong was adjudged to apologize to him publicly.

Filmography

Film

Television series

Awards and nominations

References

External links
 
 

1974 births
Living people
Beijing Normal University alumni
Male actors from Beijing
Chinese male film actors
Chinese male television actors
Chinese male voice actors
21st-century Chinese male actors